Krumiri are a kind of biscuit which is regarded as the particular delicacy of Casale Monferrato, the city in north-west Italy where they were invented in 1878 by the confectioner Domenico Rossi. They are made without water from wheat flour, sugar, butter, eggs and vanilla, in the form of a slightly bent, rough-surfaced cylinder. This handlebar shape is said to have been chosen in honour of the extravagantly moustachioed Victor Emanuel II, the first king of united Italy.<ref>[http://www.arsvitae.it/krumiri.html Krumiri], www.arsvitae.it.</ref>

They may be eaten with—or dunked in—tea, liqueurs, wine, zabaione, etc.

Recognition
Krumiri were awarded a bronze medal at the 1884 Universal Exhibition held in Turin and the following year the manufacturers received a Royal Warrant to supply the Duke of Aosta. Warrants from the Duke of Genoa and from King Umberto I followed in 1886 and 1891. Today krumiri are among the Piedmontese specialities included in the Region’s official list of Prodotto agroalimentare tradizionale''.

References

Biscuits
Cuisine of Piedmont
Casale Monferrato